Nepal Telecommunications Authority (NTA) is the telecommunications regulatory body of Nepal. It is an autonomous body established on Feb 1998 in accordance with Telecommunications Act, 1997 and Telecommunications Regulation, 1998. The NTA is responsible for regulating all matters related to telecommunications (wireless, cellular, satellite and cable) of Nepal.

The then Government of Nepal's on 25 December 1995 (2052/09/10 BS) decided to welcome private sector into the telecommunication sector in the country. This decision of the cabinet was meant to be a liberalization policy in the ICT for development. The mission of NTA is to create the optimum conditions for the development of telecommunications sector in Nepal by serving the public interest in terms of quality, choice and value for money; healthy competition among service providers and the nation in its drive for socio-economic advancement through efficient private sector participation.

NTA today publicize the MIS (Management Information System) Report periodically, usually monthly, as a process to inform citizen of the telecom statistics in the country. NTA published a Cross Holding Study report that suggested all telecom companies in Nepal to go public limited company (PLC). While this decision of January 2014 has welcomed more foreign investment in the telecom sector in the country, it has also promulgated more laws and regulations of the same.

Its objective is to create a favorable and competitive environment for the development, expansion and operation of telecommunications services with the private sector participation in Nepal. Its aims are:

     To make the telecommunications service reliable and easily available to the public.
     To make necessary arrangement to avail basic telecommunications service and facilities in all rural and urban areas throughout the kingdom of Nepal.
     To protect the rights and interests of consumers by ensuring the provision of quality service.
     To make arrangement for the coordination and healthy competition among the persons providing Telecommunications Service and facilities.
     
To meet the objectives, NTA has been actively performing the following functions:
    Granting Licenses to operate the telecommunications service in private sector. Involving national and foreign private sector investors in the operation of the Telecommunications Service.
    Prescribing, fixing and approving the standard and quality standard of the plant and equipment relating to the telecommunications and the telecommunications service.
    Approving and regularizing the fees to be collected by the licensee for providing the telecommunications Service.
    Regularly inspecting and monitoring the activities carried out by service providers to ensure that the quality of service and quality standard in telecom equipment have been maintained.
    Settling dispute between two service providers or a service provider and its customers.
    Providing suggestions to Nepal Government on the policy, plan and program to be adopted by Nepal Government for the development of the telecommunications service.

References

Telecommunications in Nepal
Telecommunications regulatory authorities
Government agencies of Nepal
Regulation in Nepal
Regulatory agencies of Nepal
1998 establishments in Nepal